Hotton War Cemetery is a Commonwealth War Graves Commission burial ground near Hotton in Belgium.

Most of the British troops who died in the battle for the Ardennes are buried here.

Notable burials 
 Ronald Cartland, British Member of Parliament killed in World War II
 Paul Rabone, New Zealand fighter pilot

References

External links
 

Commonwealth War Graves Commission cemeteries in Belgium
World War II cemeteries in Belgium
Hotton